Eureka is a historic home located near Baskerville, Mecklenburg County, Virginia. It was designed by Jacob W. Holt and built between 1854 and 1859.  The house is two stories tall and three bays wide with a central, three-story tower, embellished with a third story balcony, on the facade. The house is representative of the Italian Villa style. It features a one-story, porch and the interior features interior graining and marbleizing and custom-made furniture.  Also on the property is a contributing log corn crib.

It was listed on the National Register of Historic Places in 1980.

References

Houses on the National Register of Historic Places in Virginia
Italianate architecture in Virginia
Houses completed in 1859
Houses in Mecklenburg County, Virginia
National Register of Historic Places in Mecklenburg County, Virginia